Sarah Campion may be:
Sarah Campion, born 1983, English squash player
Sarah Campion (author), 1906–2002, English-born New Zealand author